This is a list of the number-one hits of 1975 on Italian Hit Parade Singles Chart.

Number-one artists

See also
1975 in music

References

1975 in Italian music
Italy
1975